I'm Seeking Something That Has Already Found Me is the debut album of Ozark Henry. The album was praised by David Bowie in an interview as "debut of the year", but it failed to chart and sold poorly.

Track list
All songs written by Piet Goddaer.

"Rosamund is Dead" - 5:33
"Dogs and Dogmen" - 5:38
"Black" - 4:55
"Man on Roof" - 4:43
"Great" - 4:15
"Hope Is a Dope" - 4:21
 "This Specific Cacophony" -3:30
"I Ray" - 4:12
"Autumn Illustrates This" - 5:32
"Self-Portrait Squatted" - 3:10
"I'm Seeking Something That Has Already Found Me" - 3:02
"In Camera" - 5:55

Personnel
 Piet Goddaer: voices, vocals, keyboards, organ, Rhodes, programming, drum-tapes, bass, lead guitar on "Man on Roof"
 Filip Tanghe: acoustic drums, guitars, guitar sound programming

References

Ozark Henry albums
1996 debut albums